Coleophora leucocephala is a moth of the family Coleophoridae. It is found in the dry areas of South Australia.

References

Moths of Australia
leucocephala
Moths described in 1996